Chomiąża  is a village in the administrative district of Gmina Malczyce, within Środa Śląska County, Lower Silesian Voivodeship, in south-western Poland. Like most of Silesia, it was first part of Poland, then an independent duchy which was a vassal state of the Kingdom of Bohemia. It became part of the Holy Roman Empire in 1526, then part of Prussia after the Silesian Wars. It remained part of Prussia and later Germany until 1945, when it became part of Poland, which it is still part of today. It was firstr recorded in 1175 as Chomesa, and has since carried the names Chomescha, Kumeise, Kumeyse, Komeise, Cameise, Cames, Camos, Kamos and finally its current name of Chomiaza.

References

Villages in Środa Śląska County